Christine Harris may refer to:

 Christine Harris (actress) (born 1959), Australian actress
 Christine Harris (author) (born 1955), Australian writer
 Christine Harris (swimmer) (born 1942), British swimmer
 Christine Harris (archer) (born 1956), British archer

See also
 Harris (disambiguation)
 Christine (disambiguation)
 Chris Harris (disambiguation)
 Christie Harris